Simon Winchester  (born 28 September 1944) is a British-American author and journalist. In his career at The Guardian newspaper, Winchester covered numerous significant events, including Bloody Sunday and the Watergate Scandal. Winchester has written or contributed to more than a dozen nonfiction books, has written one novel, and has contributed to several travel magazines, among them Condé Nast Traveler, Smithsonian Magazine, and National Geographic.

Early life and education
Born in London, Winchester attended several boarding schools in Dorset, including Hardye's School. He spent a year hitchhiking around the United States, then in 1963 went up to St Catherine's College, Oxford, to study geology. He graduated in 1966, and found work with Falconbridge of Africa, a Canadian mining company. His first assignment was to work as a field geologist searching for copper deposits in Uganda.

Career
While on assignment in Uganda, Winchester happened upon a copy of James Morris' Coronation Everest, an account of the 1953 expedition that led to the first successful ascent of Mount Everest. The book instilled in Winchester the desire to be a writer, so he wrote to Morris, seeking career advice. Morris urged Winchester to give up geology the very day he received the letter, and get a job as a writer on a newspaper.

In 1969 Winchester joined The Guardian, first as a regional correspondent based in Newcastle upon Tyne, but later as its Northern Ireland correspondent. Winchester's time in Northern Ireland placed him around several events of The Troubles, including the events of Bloody Sunday and the Belfast "Hour of Terror". In 1971, Winchester became involved in a controversy over the British press's coverage of Northern Ireland on the floor of the House of Commons when Bernadette Devlin described his role in reporting the shooting to death by British soldiers of Barney Watt in Hooker Street in the morning of Saturday, 6 February 1971.

After leaving Northern Ireland in 1972, Winchester was briefly assigned to Calcutta before becoming correspondent for The Guardian in Washington, DC, where he covered news ranging from the end of Richard Nixon's administration to the start of Jimmy Carter's presidency.

In 1982, while working as chief foreign feature writer for The Sunday Times, Winchester was on location for the invasion of the Falkland Islands by Argentine forces. Suspected of being a spy, Winchester was held  for three months as a prisoner in Ushuaia, Tierra del Fuego. He wrote about this event in his book, Prison Diary, published in 1983 and also in Outposts: Journeys to the Surviving Relics of the British Empire, published in 1985 as well as Atlantic:  A Vast Ocean of a Million Stories published in 2010, in which he tells of meeting up with one of his jailers many years later. In 1985, he shifted to working as a freelance writer and travelled to Hong Kong. When Condé Nast re-branded Signature magazine as Condé Nast Traveler, Winchester was appointed its Asia-Pacific Editor. Over the following fifteen years he contributed to a number of travel publications including Traveler, National Geographic and Smithsonian magazine.

Winchester's first book, In Holy Terror, was published by Faber and Faber in 1975. The book drew heavily on his experiences of the turmoil in Northern Ireland. In 1976 he published his second book, American Heartbeat, which deals with his travels through the American heartland. Winchester's first truly successful book was The Professor and the Madman (1998) published by Penguin UK as The Surgeon of Crowthorne. Telling the story of the creation of the Oxford English Dictionary, the book was a New York Times Best Seller.

Though he still writes travel books, Winchester has used the narrative non-fiction form he adopted for The Professor and the Madman several more times, resulting in multiple best-selling books. The Map that Changed the World (2001) focuses on the geologist William Smith and was Winchester's second New York Times best seller. The year 2003 saw the publication of The Meaning of Everything, which returns to the topic of the creation of the Oxford English Dictionary, and of the best-selling Krakatoa: The Day the World Exploded. Winchester then published A Crack in the Edge of the World, a book about San Francisco's 1906 earthquake. The Man Who Loved China (2008) retells the life of the scholar Joseph Needham.The Alice Behind Wonderland, an exploration of the life and work of Charles Lutwidge Dodgson (Lewis Carroll), and his relationship with Alice Liddell, was published in 2011.

Winchester's book on the Pacific Ocean, Pacific: Silicon Chips and Surfboards, Coral Reefs and Atom Bombs, Brutal Dictators, Fading Empires, and the Coming Collision of the World's Superpowers, was published in 2015. It was his second book about the Pacific region, his first, Pacific Rising: The Emergence of a New World Culture having been published in 1991.

Personal life
On 4 July 2011 Winchester was naturalized as an American citizen in a ceremony aboard the USS Constitution.

Winchester lives in Berkshire County, Massachusetts.

Works

Honours
Winchester was appointed Officer of the Order of the British Empire for "services to journalism and literature" in Queen Elizabeth II's New Year Honours list of 2006.
Winchester was named an honorary fellow at St Catherine's College, Oxford in October 2009.
Winchester received an honorary degree from Dalhousie University in October 2010.
Winchester received the Lawrence J. Burpee Medal of the Royal Canadian Geographical Society in November 2016. He was also elected a Fellow of the RCGS.

References

External links
 
 
 
 
 Simon Winchester: Annotated Bibliography – comprehensive bibliography of articles, essays, and all of Winchester's books, at SJSU’s Master of Fine Arts in Creative Writing (archived in 2011)

 Interview of Winchester by In Depth, C-SPAN, 1 August 2004

1944 births
Alumni of St Catherine's College, Oxford
British non-fiction writers
British travel writers
Living people
1906 San Francisco earthquake
Officers of the Order of the British Empire
The Guardian journalists
British male writers
Writers from London
British expatriates in the United States
Male non-fiction writers